Events in the year 1898 in Iceland.

Incumbents 

 Monarch: Christian IX
 Minister for Iceland: Nicolai Reimer Rump

Events 

 Holdsveikraspítalinn í Laugarnesi (Leprosy Hospital) is established in Laugarnes.

References 

 
1890s in Iceland
Years of the 19th century in Iceland
Iceland
Iceland